Army General Célestin Mbala Munsense is a Congolese military officer who has served as the Chief of Staff of the Armed Forces of the Democratic Republic of the Congo (FARDC) since 14 July 2018. He is considered a loyalist of President Joseph Kabila and held a number of high ranking posts in the presidential and military administration prior to his appointment, replacing Army General Didier Etumba as Chief of Staff of the Armed Forces. Before that, he was a long time Chief of Staff to the President's office, since at least 2010, as a brigadier general. In September 2014, during Kabila's restructuring of the army, Mbala was a major general and was appointed as Deputy Chief of Staff for Administration and Logistics.

As of 2009, he was a military advisor to the President and was also the FARDC director of personnel. Mbala joined the military around 1975 and had been an advisor to President Kabila since around 2007. He told foreign diplomats in Kinshasa in 2009 that the FARDC was in a state of anarchy since the Second Congo War due to the integration of undisciplined and untrained former rebels, and as director of personnel he was taking efforts to try to improve its situation.

After the election of Félix Tshisekedi to the Presidency of the DRC, in May 2019 he confirmed Mbala as FARDC chief of general staff. President Tshisekedi also promoted him to the rank of Army General.

In October 2022, President Félix Tshisekedi appointed Lieutenant-General Christian Tshiwewe Songesha as head of the army. He replaces Célestin Mbala at the head of the army. Célestin Mbala is listed among the officers awaiting retirement.

References

External links
Message from General Mbala to personnel, 2019 Digitalcongo.cd

|-

Year of birth missing (living people)
Living people
Democratic Republic of the Congo military personnel
21st-century Democratic Republic of the Congo people